Titou Le Lapinou (or Titou for short) is a fictional French singer, a little young rabbit. His target audience are young children aged around 1–6.

He is most known for his two first singles, "Le Titou" and "Le Coucou De Titou", that reached number 4 and number 6 in France, respectively. He also released two albums, Mon Premier Album in 2006 and Le Monde De Titou in 2008.

Discography

Albums

Singles

See also 
 Bébé Lilly
 Pinocchio (singer)
 Ilona Mitrecey
 Holly Dolly
 Gummibär

References

External links 
 Titou Le Lapinou profile at Charts in France
 Discography on Ultratop

Fictional rabbits and hares
Fictional singers
French children's musicians